The men's 1 km time trial was part of the 2011 UCI Para-cycling Track World Championships, held in Montichiari, Italy in March 2011.

Medalists

C1
The Final was held on 12 March.

C1 – locomotor disability: Neurological, or amputation

Final

C2
The Final was held on 12 March.

C2 – locomotor disability: Neurological, decrease in muscle strength, or amputation

Final

C3
The Final was held on 12 March.

C3 – locomotor disability: Neurological, or amputation

Final

C4
The Final was held on 12 March.

C4 – locomotor disability: Neurological, or amputation

Final

C5
The Final was held on 12 March.

C5 – locomotor disability: Neurological, or amputation

Final

Tandem B
The Final was held on 11 March.

Tandem B – visual impairment

Final

See also
2011 UCI Track Cycling World Championships – Men's 1 km time trial

References

UCI Cycling Regulations - Part 16 Para-cycling, Union Cycliste Internationale (UCI)

Time trial